Variable analysis may refer to:
 Bivariate analysis
 Multivariate analysis
 Univariate analysis